The grey-hooded fulvetta (Fulvetta cinereiceps) is a bird species in the family Paradoxornithidae. Like the other typical fulvettas, it was long included in the Timaliidae genus Alcippe or in the Sylviidae.

Formerly, F. cinereiceps was known as Manipur fulvetta, the birds properly referred to with this name have been split off and are now usually treated as a distinct species, F. manipurensis. Another former subspecies of F. cinereiceps that is nowadays usually considered distinct is the Taiwan fulvetta (F. formosana).

Its natural habitat is temperate forest. It is not considered threatened by the IUCN.

References

 
 Collar, N.J. & Robson, Craig (2007): Family Timaliidae (Babblers). In: del Hoyo, Josep; Elliott, Andrew & Christie, D.A. (eds.): Handbook of Birds of the World, Volume 12 (Picathartes to Tits and Chickadees): 70-291. Lynx Edicions, Barcelona.

grey-hooded fulvetta
Birds of China
Endemic birds of China
grey-hooded fulvetta
Taxonomy articles created by Polbot